Wolfgang Schreyer (20 November 1927 – 14 November 2017) was a German writer of fiction, historic adventures mixed with documentary, science fiction for TV shows and movies and is best known as the author of over 20 adventure stories.

Life
Wolfgang Schreyer was born the son of a pharmacist.   On leaving secondary school he was conscripted as a Flakhelfer before, in April 1944, he joined the Nazi Party and served in the Wehrmacht. He became a POW and was released by the Americans in 1946. From 1947 until 1949 he was a chemists' apprentice, working in that profession until 1950. From 1950 to 1952, he was the manager of a pharmaceutical company in the German Democratic Republic.

Since the publication of his first crime novel, Großgarage Südwest, he worked as a freelance author. He travelled several times to the Caribbean and to the United States. Since 1958, the GDR's Staatssicherheitsdienst (Stasi) kept him under special surveillance. Until 1972 Schreyer lived in Magdeburg; since then he lived in Ahrenshoop on the coast of the Baltic Sea.

Schreyer was the author of numerous novels, which are mainly considered entertainment, containing some criticism of society. Most successful were the stories set in Central America and the Caribbean, in which he skillfully mixed fiction and documentary. Other works are crime stories, a science-fiction story, film scripts, TV and radio drama. Having sold more than five million copies, Schreyer is considered one of the most successful East German authors.

In 1956, Schreyer was awarded the Heinrich-Mann-Preis. Since 1952,he was a member of the East German authors guild, since 1974 a member of P.E.N.; and since German reunification in 1990 he was a member of the German authors guild.

Schreyer died on 14 November 2017 at the age of 89.

Work
 Großgarage Südwest, Berlin 1952
 Mit Kräuterschnaps und Gottvertrauen, Berlin 1953
 Unternehmen "Thunderstorm", Berlin 1954
 Die Banknote, Berlin 1955
 Schüsse über der Ostsee, Berlin 1956
 Der Traum des Hauptmann Loy, Berlin 1956
 Das Attentat, Berlin 1957
 Der Spion von Akrotiri, Berlin 1957
 Alaskafüchse, Berlin 1959
 Das grüne Ungeheuer, Berlin 1959
 Entscheidung an der Weichsel, Berlin 1960
 Tempel des Satans, Berlin 1960
 Die Piratenchronik, Berlin 1961 (republished in 1967 as Augen am Himmel: Eine Piratenchronik (Eyes in the sky))
 Vampire, Tyrannen, Rebellen, Berlin 1963 (together with Günter Schumacher)
 Preludio 11, Berlin 1964
 Fremder im Paradies, Halle (Saale) 1966 (republished 1971 within Welt der Abenteuer)
 Aufstand des Sisyphos, Berlin 1969 (together with Jürgen Hell)
 Der gelbe Hai, Berlin 1969
 Bananengangster, Berlin 1970
 Der Adjutant, Halle (S.) 1971
 Der Resident, Halle (Saale) 1973
 Tod des Chefs oder Die Liebe zur Opposition, Berlin 1975
 Schwarzer Dezember, Halle (Saale) 1977
 Die Entführung, Halle [u.a.] 1979
 Der Reporter, Halle [u.a.] 1980
 Die Suche oder Die Abenteuer des Uwe Reuss, Berlin 1981
 Eiskalt im Paradies, Halle [u.a.] 1982
 Die fünf Leben des Dr. Gundlach, Berlin 1982
 Der Fund oder Die Abenteuer des Uwe Reuss, Berlin 1987
 Der Mann auf den Klippen, Berlin 1987
 Der sechste Sinn, Halle [u.a.] 1987
 Unabwendbar, Berlin 1988
 Die Beute, Rostock 1989
 Endzeit der Sieger, Halle [u.a.] 1989
 Alpträume, Oschersleben 1991
 Nebel, Berlin 1991
 Das Quartett, Berlin 1994
 Der zweite Mann, Berlin 2000
 Der Verlust oder Die Abenteuer des Uwe Reuss, Rostock 2001
 Das Kurhaus, Rostock 2002
 Die Legende, Berlin 2006 (together with Paul Schreyer)

References

External links
 
 Profile at Stiftung zur Aufarbeitung der SED-Diktatur
 Profile at mvweb.de
 http://www.dielegende.info/
 https://web.archive.org/web/20120213134430/http://www.ila-bonn.de/buchbesprechungen/buecher249.htm

1927 births
2017 deaths
Writers from Magdeburg
People from the Province of Saxony
Nazi Party members
East German writers
German male novelists
20th-century German male writers
20th-century German novelists
21st-century German novelists
21st-century German male writers
German military personnel of World War II
German prisoners of war in World War II held by the United States
Heinrich Mann Prize winners